The Vanilla Ice Project is an American reality television series on the DIY Network. It is hosted by construction contractor and rapper Rob Van Winkle, a.k.a. Vanilla Ice, who has significant experience with home improvement and real estate flipping. Ice began purchasing houses in his early twenties and became more involved in home improvement projects starting around 1998.

Production 
The series premiered on October 14, 2010 with the initial season continuing until January 1, 2011. Season 2 of The Vanilla Ice Project started on January 21, 2012, and featured a new house and more up-to-date and state-of-the-art improvements. To mark the premiere, Vanilla Ice posted live Tweets during the show on Twitter, answering fan questions and commenting on the show.

Due to the success of the show, Vanilla Ice launched a training course that aims to help others succeed at real estate investing.

Episodes

Awards 
In addition to winning the Telly Award, the Factual Entertainment Award and Hermes Platinum Press Award, the first season of The Vanilla Ice Project was selected as a finalist for the Cable Fax Awards.

Home media 
A deluxe edition DVD box set of the first season was released in late 2016. This included deleted scenes as well as a bonus episode that follows Vanilla Ice and his long-time friend Dave Whitman as they remodel Whitman's home in Pennsylvania. The series is available to stream on Discovery+.

External links 
 
 Official site for The Vanilla Ice Project
 Vanilla Ice Real Estate's official website

References 

2010 American television series debuts
2010s American reality television series
2019 American television series endings
DIY Network original programming
English-language television shows
Home renovation television series
Vanilla Ice